The 2014 BWF World Junior Championships were held in Alor Setar, Malaysia April 7–18, 2014.

Medalists

Medal table

External links
World Juniors Team Championships 2014 at Tournamentsoftware.com
World Junior Championships 2014 at Tournamentsoftware.com

BWF World Junior Championships
World Junior Championships
2014 BWF World Junior Championships
Bwf World Junior Championships
 
BWF World Junior Championships
BWF World Junior Championships
BWF World Junior Championships